Cucullia strigata, the streaked hooded owlet or streaky falconer, is a species of moth in the family Noctuidae (the owlet moths). It was first described by Smith in 1892 and it is found in North America.

The MONA or Hodges number for Cucullia strigata is 10183.

References

Further reading

 
 
 

Cucullia
Articles created by Qbugbot
Moths described in 1892